Frank Hornstein (born September 27, 1959) is an American politician serving in the Minnesota House of Representatives since 2003. A member of the Minnesota Democratic–Farmer–Labor Party (DFL), Hornstein represents District 61A, which includes parts of the city of Minneapolis in Hennepin County, Minnesota.

Early Life and Education
Hornsein was born in Cincinnati, Ohio. He received his bachelor's degree in environmental studies from Macalester College in St. Paul, Minnesota. He earned a master's in urban and environmental policy from Tufts University, and attended graduate school at the University of Minnesota's Humphrey Institute.

From 2000 until his election to the State House, Hornstein served on the Twin Cities Metropolitan Council after being appointed by Governor Jesse Ventura.

Minnesota House of Representatives
Hornstein was elected to the Minnesota House of Representatives in 2002 and has been reelected every two years since.

From 2007 to 2010, Hornstein chaired the Transportation and Transit Policy Committee. He chaired the Transportation Finance Committee again in 2013-14, and has chaired the Transportation Finance and Policy Committee since 2019. Hornstein also sits on the Climate and Energy Finance and Policy, Sustainable Infrastructure Policy, and Ways and Means Committees.

Electoral history

Personal life
Hornstein, who is Jewish, is married to Marcia Zimmerman, chief Rabbi at Temple Israel in Minneapolis.

References

External links

Rep. Frank Hornstein Web Page
Minnesota Public Radio - Votetracker: Rep. Frank Hornstein
Project Vote Smart - Rep. Frank Hornstein Profile
Follow the Money - Frank Hornstein
2006 2004 2002 campaign contributions

1959 births
Living people
Humphrey School of Public Affairs alumni
Politicians from Minneapolis
Democratic Party members of the Minnesota House of Representatives
20th-century American Jews
21st-century American politicians
21st-century American Jews
Jewish American state legislators in Minnesota